The 20th session of the National Assembly of South Korea first convened on 30 May 2016 and was seated until 29 May 2020. Its members were first elected in the 2016 legislative election held on 13 April 2016.  It was preceded by the 19th National Assembly of South Korea and succeeded by the 21st National Assembly of South Korea.

Composition 

In the 2016 legislative election, four political parties were elected to the Assembly. As of 2017, three additional parties were newly established.

List of members

Constituency

Seoul

Busan

Daegu

Incheon

Gwangju

Daejeon

Ulsan

Sejong

Gyeonggi

Gangwon

North Chungcheong

South Chungcheong

North Jeolla

South Jeolla

North Gyeongsang

South Gyeongsang

Jeju

Proportional representation

Democratic

United Future

Minsaeng

Justice 

020
National Assembly members 020